Irina Buryachok and Oksana Kalashnikova were the defending champions, but Buryachok decided not to participate.  Kalashnikova played alongside Olga Savchuk, but lost in the semifinals to Alexandra Panova and Heather Watson. 
Alexandra Panova and Heather Watson won the title, defeating Raluca Olaru and Shahar Pe'er in the final, 6–2, 7–6(7–3).

Seeds

Draw

Draw

References
 Main Draw

Baku Cup - Doubles
2014 Doubles